Washington's 1st legislative district is one of 49 districts in Washington state for representation in the state legislature. The T-shaped district is mostly north of the borders of King and Snohomish counties, stretching from High Bridge Road and Broadway Avenue in the east through the entirety of the cities of Bothell and Brier to I-5 in Mountlake Terrace in the west, though the district sweeps south of Bothell to part of Kirkland and reaches to Lake Washington.

The district's legislators are state senator Derek Stanford and state representatives Davina Duerr (position 1) and Shelley Kloba (position 2), all Democrats.

Patty Murray, Washington's current senior U.S. Senator, the fourth-highest-ranking Democrat and the highest-ranking woman in the Senate, represented the 1st legislative district in the Washington State Senate for the 1989–1993 term, directly before being elected to the United States Senate. However most of her district is now the 32nd district since she was living at the time in what is now Shoreline.

2012 redistricting

Following the 2010 United States Census, the Washington Redistricting Commission was tasked with re-drawing Washington's 49 legislative districts and 10 congressional districts. Before redistricting, Washington's 1st legislative district had a greater portion of unincorporated Snohomish County, particularly in the area west of Mill Creek, and none of the city of Kirkland within its borders.

Recent election results

State Senator

State Representative, position 1

State Representative, position 2

See also
Washington Redistricting Commission
Washington State Legislature
Washington State Senate
Washington House of Representatives
Washington (state) legislative districts

References

External links
Washington State Redistricting Commission
Washington House of Representatives
Map of Legislative Districts

01